Melita Maschmann (January 10, 1918 – February 4, 2010) was a German memoirist. She achieved renown with her 1963 book Fazit: Kein Rechtfertigungsversuch (lit: "Account Rendered: No Attempt at Justification") which recounted her years as a member of the Hitler Youth and a propagandist for the Nazi machine.

The book was translated into English by Geoffrey Strachan as Account Rendered: A Dossier on my Former Self, and published as an eBook in 2013 by Plunkett Lake Press. 

Maschmann never married and had no children. For the last ten years of her life, she suffered from Alzheimer's disease. Maschmann's life was portrayed in the documentary Teenage (2013) where she was played by Ivy Blackshire.

References

External links
Women Revisit the Third Reich

Nazi propagandists
Women in Nazi Germany
1918 births
2010 deaths
Hitler Youth members
German memoirists
People with Alzheimer's disease
Women memoirists